Mette Lange-Nielsen (30 April 1929 – 29 May 1981) was a Norwegian actress. Her husband was actor Per Lillo-Stenberg, and her son is musician Lars Lillo-Stenberg.

Filmography 
 1951: Dei svarte hestane
 1956: Roser til Monica
 1956: Kvinnens plass
 1959: Hete septemberdager
 1959: Støv på hjernen
 1960: Der Kampf um den Adlerfels (Venner)
 1961: Bussen
 1963: Om Tilla
 1966: Broder Gabrielsen
 1967: Musikanter
 1969: Tipp topp. Husmorfilmen
 1972: Ture Sventon - Privatdetektiv
 1973: Lina's Wedding (Jentespranget)
 1975: Min Marion
 1981: Kleine Ida (Liten Ida)

External links 
 
 Mette Lange-Nielsen auf filmfront.no

References 

Norwegian film actresses
1929 births
1981 deaths
20th-century Norwegian actresses
Place of birth missing